Thierry Marc Boutsen (born 13 July 1957) is a Belgian former racing driver who raced for the Arrows, Benetton, Williams, Ligier and Jordan teams in Formula One. He competed in 164 World Championship Grands Prix (163 starts), winning three races, achieving 15 podiums and scoring 132 career points. His best finish in the World Drivers' Championship was fourth in  whilst driving for Benetton.

Career

Junior formulae and sportscars
After winning the "Volant V" in 1977 at the André Pilette Racing School, Zolder, Boutsen entered the Belgian Formula Ford 1600 championship and won it in 1978 with 15 victories in 18 races. He also entered the 1978 Spa 24 Hours race, the last auto race on the old 14 km (8.7 mi) Spa-Francorchamps circuit- driving a Toyota Trueno. For 1979 he moved to Formula 3, winning three races in 1980 and second place in the European title race, behind Michele Alboreto. In 1981 he moved to Formula 2 and was again second in the European championship, including winning at the 14-mile Nürburgring- this time behind Geoff Lees.

He also entered the 1981 24 Hours of Le Mans. The race started at 3pm in unusually hot weather – one hour earlier than usual due to the Parliamentary elections held on the same weekend. A suspension piece had failed and the car hit the guard-rail losing the entire rear end. Three marshals and a gendarme were struck by the debris. One of them, Thierry Mabilat, was killed - struck in the chest by a detached piece of the guard rail. The other two marshals, Claude Hertault and Serge David (who lost an arm), and the gendarme were all seriously injured.

In 1983 Boutsen drove in the European Touring Car Championship and in World Sportscar races, where he won the very first Group C race, the Monza 1000 km with Bob Wollek driving a Porsche 956. He also won the famous Daytona 24-hour race in 1985, co-driving the Porsche 956 from the Preston Henn Racing with Bob Wollek, A. J. Foyt and Al Unser Sr.

Formula One

Arrows
Boutsen was considered a promising driver, testing for McLaren and Brabham. He was briefly attached to the Spirit Honda F1 project before losing out to his Formula Two teammate Stefan Johansson. In 1983 he paid $500,000 for a drive in Formula One and made his debut with Arrows at his home race, the 1983 Belgian Grand Prix at the shortened 7 km (4.3 mi) Spa. While he scored no points in 1983 his careful handling and close performance compared to experienced teammate Marc Surer allowed him to foster a positive reputation within the team. With backing from Barclay cigarettes he remained with Arrows for a further three seasons. The first saw Arrows struggle with their difficult first turbocharged car, with powerful BMW turbo engines but poor handling. Boutsen scored points twice in the old Cosworth DFV powered A6 and once in the turbo machine. His second season saw several notable results, including 2nd place at Imola. Boutsen crossed the line third, behind Alain Prost and Elio de Angelis but after the race, Prost was disqualified because his car was 2 kg underweight. Three more points scores saw him 11th overall in the standings. A final season with Arrows saw no points for Boutsen in an uncompetitive car, but in parallel to F1 he drove for the Walter Brun team in Group C and clinched the World Championship title with them in 1986, winning that year's Spa 1000 km.

Benetton

Boutsen got his big chance when he switched to the works Ford Europe F1 team, Benetton, for the  season as teammate to Teo Fabi. While the package wasn't a race winner, it did allow him to run regularly in the top 6. He scored points in six races, his best being awarded 3rd place in Adelaide after the disqualification of Ayrton Senna's Lotus and moved to 8th overall. At the Australian Grand Prix, Boutsen was furious with Fabi when the Italian refused to let his teammate lap him for a number of laps. When Boutsen confronted Fabi about this after the race, a frustrated Fabi (who had been unable to find an F1 drive for ), told the Belgian to "come back and see me when you have a pole position". Fabi scored no wins in his F1 career but did have 3 poles to his name while at that stage Boutsen could only boast his 2nd place at Imola in 1985.

 saw Boutsen with a new teammate, the Italian Alessandro Nannini. When Cosworth stopped development of their turbocharged V6 engine, Benetton were forced to switch to normally aspirated Ford DFR V8 engines in anticipation of the banning of turbos in 1989. Boutsen's consistency, mechanical sympathy and speed in the Rory Byrne designed Benetton B188 saw him score points in 10 of the 16 races, including five 3rd-place finishes (all behind the all-conquering McLaren-Honda cars), and place 4th overall as the best non-turbo driver in the field.

Williams
Frank Williams signed Boutsen in the summer of 1988 to replace Nigel Mansell for 1989 as  Mansell had signed to move to Ferrari. Boutsen's reputation as a reliable, fast driver with good development skills saw Williams sign him on a two-year contract.

For 1989, he drove the new V10 Renault powered Williams FW12C.  began with Boutsen on the back foot due to a heavy pre-season testing crash in Rio and because veteran teammate Riccardo Patrese had a major resurgence in form. However at the Canadian Grand Prix, Boutsen drove well in wet conditions and took his maiden victory after Senna suffered a late engine failure. Although it was a welcome win (Boutsen became the first new winner in F1 since former Arrows teammate Gerhard Berger had won the 1986 Mexican Grand Prix for Benetton), it was considered a lucky win for the Belgian as he had been last at one stage and had a full 360° spin, though luckily he managed to keep his car off the walls. He managed to catch and pass Patrese who was suffering with a loose undertray and took the lead 3 laps from the end when the Honda V10 engine in Senna's McLaren MP4/5 seized. Three more podium finishes came before Boutsen rounded the year off with a second victory at the rain-soaked Australian Grand Prix. Ironically Boutsen had been one of the drivers protesting about the conditions at the circuit before the race.

 saw more consistent points scoring drives, including his third and final Grand Prix victory - a lights-to-flag victory in Hungary where he took his first pole position and held off sustained pressure from Alessandro Nannini (Benetton) and Ayrton Senna (McLaren) to win. However, with Nigel Mansell available in 1991, Williams felt they needed a 'star' driver to put together a championship bid. Despite Boutsen winning three races in two years to Patrese's one, the team felt that Patrese had been more consistent (and had worked well with Mansell in 1988) and decided to keep the Italian to drive alongside Mansell.

Ligier

With no vacancies among the top teams Boutsen had to drop down to the Ligier team. Despite having a sizeable budget and Lamborghini V12 engines, the JS35 was an uncompetitive car and Boutsen was frequently unable to disguise his disgust with the machinery given to him. The arrival of Renault engines in 1992 improved matters a little and in his final race for the team he scored 5th place, his first points since leaving Williams.

Jordan
Initially he was unable to find a drive for 1993 but Barclay secured him a slot at Jordan, replacing Ivan Capelli. Boutsen was too tall for the car and largely outpaced by young teammate Rubens Barrichello, failing to score any points in ten races. With Eddie Jordan keen to bring in younger, well-sponsored drivers to the seat the decision was taken to turn Boutsen's home race into a farewell event, though he retired on the first lap.

Touring cars

For 1994, Boutsen was hired by Ford Motorsport to lead their works challenge on the newly created Super Tourenwagen Cup in Germany. Driving a factory prepared Ford Mondeo built by Eggenberger Motorsport, that first season was a learning year for both Boutsen and the team.

The following year, Boutsen was joined by his old Williams teammate Riccardo Patrese, but the season was a disaster. Attempting to follow Audi's lead by developing a four-wheel drive car, the Mondeo was totally uncompetitive.

Boutsen started in only the first four races in 1996 before leaving the team and turning his attention to sports car racing. After three years of limited success, Ford pulled the plug on the project at the end of that season to focus solely on the British series.

Sportscars
Boutsen then drove sports cars in the US, driving for Champion Racing in a Porsche 911 GT1, alongside Bill Adam and Hans Stuck.  The trio finished 2nd in class at the 24 Hours of Daytona in 1997, Boutsen won the GT-1 US Championship with the Champion Racing in 1998. After a crash at Le Mans in 1999 at the wheel of a Toyota GT-One he retired from racing altogether.

Helmet

Boutsen's helmet was black with a red, orange and yellow ribbon design surrounding the visor and the rear area. The colours used are the colours of the Belgian flag (except for orange).

Business
Today Boutsen runs his own company, Boutsen Aviation, in Monaco. Its business is the "Sale and Acquisition of Business Jets". He founded the company in 1997 with his wife Daniela and up to May 2011, the company had sold 205 aircraft, ranging from Airbus Corporate Jets to Cessna Citation. He is also co-owner of Boutsen Energy Racing alongside his brother-in-law Olivier Lainé and Georges Kaczka. The team competes in the Formula Le Mans class in the Le Mans Series. Boutsen also runs cars in Formula Renault and Eurocup Mégane Trophy.

Racing record

Career summary

Complete European Formula Two Championship results
(key) (Races in bold indicate pole position; races in italics indicate fastest lap)

Complete Formula One results
(key) (Races in bold indicate pole position; races in italics indicate fastest lap)

Complete 24 Hours of Le Mans results

Complete Super Tourenwagen Cup results
(key) (Races in bold indicate pole position) (Races in italics indicate fastest lap)

Complete FIA GT Championship results
(key) (Races in bold indicate pole position) (Races in italics indicate fastest lap)

References

External links

Boutsen Aviation official website

Belgian racing drivers
Belgian Formula One drivers
Arrows Formula One drivers
Benetton Formula One drivers
Williams Formula One drivers
Ligier Formula One drivers
Jordan Formula One drivers
Formula One race winners
European Formula Two Championship drivers
FIA European Formula 3 Championship drivers
German Formula Three Championship drivers
24 Hours of Le Mans drivers
1957 births
Living people
Racing drivers from Brussels
24 Hours of Daytona drivers
American Le Mans Series drivers
World Sportscar Championship drivers
24 Hours of Spa drivers
Sports car racing team owners
Porsche Motorsports drivers
Peugeot Sport drivers
Toyota Gazoo Racing drivers
Team Joest drivers